Jeans Coops was a Belgian bobsledder who competed in the late 1930s. He won a gold medal in the two-man event at the 1939 FIBT World Championships in St. Moritz.

References
Bobsleigh two-man world championship medalists since 1931

Belgian male bobsledders
Possibly living people
Year of birth missing